The Anglican Church of Korea has its own calendar of saints.

History

Characteristics

See also
 Calendar of saints (Hong Kong Sheng Kung Hui)

Korean
Calendar